The 1980 Israeli Labor Party leadership election was held on 18 December 1980. It saw Shimon Peres reelected as the party's leader. Peres defeated Yitzhak Rabin.

This was the third of four leadership contests in which Rabin and Peres faced each other (following the 1974 and February 1977 and preceding by the 1992 leadership elections).

Background
The vote took place in advance of the 1981 Knesset election. At the time of the leadership election, Labor was broadly anticipated, per opinion polls, to have a strong performance over rival Likud in that election.

Candidates
Shimon Peres, incumbent leader since 1977, member of the Knesset since 1959, former minister of defense (1974–1977), former Minister of Information (1974), former Minister of Transportation (1970–1974), and former Minister of Immigration and Absorption (1969–1970)
Yitzhak Rabin, former leader (1974–1977), former prime minister (1974–1977), member of the Knesset since 1973, former Minister of Labour (1974), former ambassador to the United States (1968–1973), and former Chief of the General Staff (1964–1968)

Campaign
Peres was expected to secure a comfortable reelection as party leader. Rabin attempted to persuade the delegates comprising the electorate that he was more popular than Peres, and therefore presented the party with a greater chance at leading in the 1981 Knesset election.

Voting procedure
The election's electorate was the 3,101 delegates to the party's convention.

Results

References

Israeli Labor Party leadership elections
Labor Party leadership
Israeli Labor Party leadership election
Yitzhak Rabin
Shimon Peres
Israeli Labor Party leadership election